Fierozzo (Mócheno: Vlarotz) is a comune (municipality) in Trentino in the northern Italian region Trentino-Alto Adige/Südtirol, located about  northeast of Trento. In the census of 2001, 423 inhabitants out of 441 (95.9%) declared themselves members of the Mócheno linguistic group.

Fierozzo borders the following municipalities: Palù del Fersina, Sant'Orsola Terme, Torcegno, Frassilongo and Roncegno.

Demographic evolution

References

Cities and towns in Trentino-Alto Adige/Südtirol